Hongshuia is a genus of cyprinid fish that consists of four species, all endemic to China.

Species
 Hongshuia banmo E. Zhang, X. Qiang & J. H. Lan, 2008
 Hongshuia megalophthalmus (Chen, Yang, & Cui, 2006)
 Hongshuia microstomatus (D. Z. Wang & Yi-Yu Chen, 1989)
 Hongshuia paoli E. Zhang, X. Qiang & J. H. Lan, 2008

References

 

 
Freshwater fish of China
Cyprinid fish of Asia
Cyprinidae genera